De Córdova or de Córdoba may refer to:

People

Arts and entertainment
 Rudolph de Cordova (1860–1941), Jamaican–British writer and actor
 Leander de Cordova (1877–1969), Jamaican actor and film director
 Pedro de Córdoba (1881–1950), American actor
 Fred de Cordova (1910–2001), American director and producer, worked on The Tonight Show Starring Johnny Carson
 Arturo de Córdova (1908–1973), Mexican film actor

Military
 Luis de Córdova y Córdova (1706–1796), admiral, commanded the Spanish fleet in the Anglo-Spanish War
 Pedro Hernández de Córdova, Spanish soldier in the Arauco War in the 16th century
 José de Córdoba y Ramos (1732–1815), Spanish explorer and naval officer
 Alonso de Cordova y Figueroa (died 1698), Spanish soldier in Chile

Politics
 Jacob De Cordova (1808–1868), Texas politician
 Marsha de Cordova (born 1976), British Labour politician

Other people
 Pedro de Córdoba, (died 1525), Spanish missionary, author and inquisitor in Hispaniola
 Juan de Córdova (1503–1595), Spanish linguist

Other
 DeCordova, Texas, a city
 De Cordova Bend Dam on the Brazos River, Texas

Spanish-language surnames
Spanish toponymic surnames